Cabeceira Grande is a municipality in northern part of the Brazilian state of Minas Gerais.  It is located just south of the boundary with the Federal District and the national capital Brasília.  The population was 6,988 (2020) in a total area of 1,026 km2.  The elevation of the municipal seat is 923 m above sea level.

Cabeceira Grande is 11 kilometers east of state highway MG-188, which connects Patrocínio to the national highway BR-40 near Formosa.  It is approximately 70 km northwest of regional center Unaí and is part of the statistical micro-region of Unaí.

The main economic activities are cattle raising (32,000 head in 2006) and farming, especially the growing of soybeans (7,400 ha.), sorghum (1,000 ha.), corn (5,250 ha.), and beans (4,250 ha.).  There was also some planting of coffee, hearts of palm, and rice.

The biggest employers in the town were public administration and farming.  In 2007 there were 167 automobiles.  There were no banks.

The school system there served 1,307 students in primary school in 2006; and 349 in middle school. There were two public health clinics.

References

IBGE

Municipalities in Minas Gerais